The 2016 McNeese State Cowboys football team represented McNeese State University in the 2016 NCAA Division I FCS football season. The Cowboys were led by first-year head coach Lance Guidry and played their home games at Cowboy Stadium. They were a member of the Southland Conference. They finished the season 6–5, 5–4 in Southland play to finish in a tie for fourth place.

Previous season
The Cowboys finished the 2015 season 10–1, 9–0 in Southland play to win the Southland Conference title. They went undefeated 10–0 in the regular season. They received the Southland's automatic bid to the FCS Playoffs where they lost in the second round to fellow Southland member Sam Houston State.

Schedule

Game summaries

Tarleton State

Sources:

@ Louisiana–Lafayette

Sources:

Stephen F. Austin

Sources:

@ Incarnate Word

Sources: Box Score

Nicholls State

Sources:

@ Southeastern Louisiana

Sources:

Central Arkansas

Sources:

@ Northwestern State

Sources:

Abilene Christian

Sources:

@ Sam Houston State

Sources:

Lamar

Sources:

Ranking movements

References

McNeese State
McNeese Cowboys football seasons
McNeese State Cowboys football